Kensington Park is a large urban park in Burnaby, British Columbia, Canada. It is located between major roads running along its perimeter - Hastings Street, Curtis Street, Kensington Avenue and Holdom Avenue.

Kensington Park is adjacent to Burnaby North Secondary School with its several sports fields, among them soccer and baseball. Kensington Arena, a neighbourhood ice rink, is at the entrance to the park.

Kensington Park is mostly known for its pitch and putt facilities which attract many Burnaby golfers.

Beecher Creek, one of the streams in North Burnaby, winds its way through Kensington Park.

References
City of Burnaby

Parks in Burnaby